Trochocarpa cunninghamii is a flowering plant species of the family Ericaceae. It is commonly referred to as straggling purpleberry due to its round flattened mauve drupe fruits. This woody shrub is usually found in the understorey of rainforests and subalpine forests in the Central Plateau and western Tasmania, and is endemic to Tasmania.

Description 
T. cunninghamii is a low scrambling prostrate shrub with reddish new growth. Leaves are 5-10mm long (with 5-7 veins visible from the underside of the leaf) at alternate at right angles to the stem, with a dark green adaxial (upper) surface and a lighter abaxial (lower) surface. In summer, pink and white tubular flowers bloom and have dangling spikes near the end of branches. The purplish blue-black fruit is present year-round and is described as round flattened mauve drupes about 1 cm in diameter.

The foliage of this species can be mistaken for Trochocarpa gunnii as it has a similar appearance. T. cunninghamii can be easily distinguished from T. gunnii by its growth habit; T. gunnii is a larger (3–6 metres high, 2–3 metres wide) erect dense to open shrub to small tree, whereas T. cunninghamii has a low scrambling habit (0.2-1.5 metres high, 0.5–2 metres wide). T. cunninghamii is more commonly found at high altitudes than T. gunnii. Trochocarpa disticha also closely resembles T. cunninghamii, however T. disticha is a large shrub with larger leaves, restricted to far southeast Tasmania and regarded as uncommon.

Distinguishing features 

 Conspicuous reddish new growth
 Leaves at right angles to the stem
 5-7 veins visible from the underside of the leaf
 Scrambling (prostrate) shrub
 Understorey plant
 Endemic to Tasmania

Taxonomy 
The species was first described by Augustin Pyramus de Candolle in 1839 as Decaspora cunninghami, and in 1963 was transferred to the genus, Trochocarpa, by Winifred Curtis. The Council of Heads of Australasian Herbaria accepts this name. However, Plants of the World online considers Trochocarpa cunninghamii to be a synonym of Trochocarpa disticha Spreng.

Etymology 
This is attributed to the separation of the fruit which is arranged into "ten single-seeded stones", likened to spokes on a wheel.

The species name, cunninghamii, honours English botanist Allan Cunningham, who circumnavigated Australia between 1816 and 1839 to collect plants.

Habitat and Distribution 
T. cunninghamii is found only in subalpine forests and rainforest in Tasmania. It is commonly found in the understorey layer of forests in the Central Plateau and western Tasmania.  T. cunninghamii can also sometimes be found in alpine woodland and rocky habitats at high altitudes.  Almost all recorded sightings are restricted to the western half of Tasmania.

References 



Flora of Tasmania
Endemic flora of Tasmania
cunninghamii
Plants described in 1839